Silvertone is the debut album by American musician Chris Isaak, released in 1985, and named after his three-piece backup band, though only one of the members actually appears on the album. The US edition includes the song "Another Idea" as track 13 and early CD editions of the album utilized CD+G technology.  The album sold poorly in the US but became a minor hit in Australia, peaking at #77 in June 1986.

Tracks in popular culture
The album was not a hit until the song "Gone Ridin was featured in the 1986 David Lynch film Blue Velvet, the first of many Isaak/Lynch collaborations, though the song had previously appeared on the soundtrack to the film American Flyers the year before. "Livin’ for Your Lover" is also featured in the former. "Dancin appeared in the film Modern Girls released the same year, but wasn't included on the soundtrack. It also appeared in the season 2 episode of Miami Vice 'Payback'. "Gone Ridin was used in the 1987 comedy Morgan Stewart's Coming Home. Two songs from this album were played on the Fox's long running teen drama Beverly Hills, 90210 including "Gone Ridin, which was played in the Season 2 episode "Pass, Not Pass"; and "Dancin which was played in the Season 3 episode "Castles in the Sand".

Track listing
All songs written by Chris Isaak.
 "Dancin – 3:44
 "Talk to Me" – 3:04
 "Livin' for Your Lover" – 2:56
 "Back on Your Side" – 3:14
 "Voodoo" – 2:44
 "Funeral in the Rain" – 3:18
 "The Lonely Ones" – 3:12
 "Unhappiness" – 3:10
 "Tears" – 2:44
 "Gone Ridin – 2:36
 "Pretty Girls Don't Cry" – 2:24
 "Western Stars" – 3:12
 "Another Idea" – 2:53 (U.S. edition only)

Personnel
Musicians
 Chris Isaak – vocals, guitar
 James Calvin Wilsey – lead guitar, lap steel guitar
 Prairie Prince – drums
 Chris Solberg – bass
 Pee Wee Ellis – saxophone
 Jim Keltner – drums on "Livin' for Your Lover"
 Pat Craig – organ

Production
Produced by Erik Jacobsen
Engineered by Tom Mallon, Mark Needham, Lee Herschberg, Dave Carlson, Pat Craig
Mastered by Greg Fulginiti at Artisan Sound Recorders
Michael Zagaris - inner booklet photography
Rick Lopez - front cover photography

Charts

Certifications

References

Chris Isaak albums
1985 debut albums
Warner Records albums
Albums produced by Erik Jacobsen